Hansjakob Keller (also Hans Jakob Keller, 18 September 1921 – c. 2008) was a Swiss rower. He competed at the 1947 European Rowing Championships in Lucerne where he won a bronze medal in the single scull boat class. He went to the 1948 Summer Olympics and was eliminated in the round one repêchage in single scull. He won another European bronze medal in single scull in 1949. In later life, he was vice-president of the Swiss Rowing Federation. He died in circa 2008.

References

1921 births
2000s deaths
Swiss male rowers
Olympic rowers of Switzerland
Rowers at the 1948 Summer Olympics
European Rowing Championships medalists